Andy Galvin (born 13 November 1965 in Whitstable, Kent, United Kingdom) was a speedway rider, most notable for his performances in the late 1980s and 1990 when he consistently appeared near the top of the UK National League averages.

Career Summary
Galvin raced for several British league clubs during his career, starting with Crayford Kestrels in 1982, but spent his most successful years with the Hackney Kestrels between 1984 and 1990.  He made 1 appearance for England in a test match against the USA in 1991.

A serious leg injury inflicted in a crash with Australian Scott Humphries at Rye House in 1990 lead to a decline in Galvin's results.

Despite this, Galvin returned to the top league of UK speedway with the Arena Essex Hammers in 1992 before another accident which left him with serious neck, back and leg injuries saw him advised to retire from the sport by medics.

After a break of nearly 10 years, Galvin returned to racing in 2001 but, after failing to recapture his previous form, retired again midway through the 2003 season.

References 

British speedway riders
1965 births
Living people
People from Whitstable
Crayford Kestrels riders